Walter James "Jim" McNerney Jr. (born August 22, 1949) is a business executive who was President and CEO of The Boeing Company, June 2005–July 2015. McNerney was also Chairman from June 2005 until March 1, 2016. McNerney oversaw development of the Boeing 737 MAX.

Education 
McNerney was born in Providence, Rhode Island. He graduated from New Trier High School in Winnetka, Illinois in 1967. He attended Yale University, receiving a B.A. degree in 1971. While at Yale, he was a member of Delta Kappa Epsilon fraternity and excelled in baseball and hockey. After graduating from Yale, he worked for a year at both British United Provident and G.D. Searle, LLC, then attended Harvard Business School, receiving a Master of Business Administration in 1975.

Career 
McNerney began his business career at Procter & Gamble in 1975, working in brand management. He worked as a management consultant at McKinsey from 1978 to 1982.

McNerney joined General Electric in 1982. There, he held top executive positions including president and CEO of GE Aircraft Engines and GE Lighting; president of GE Asia-Pacific; president and CEO of GE Electrical Distribution and Control; executive vice president of GE Capital, one of the world's largest financial service companies; and president of GE Information Services. McNerney competed with Robert Nardelli and Jeff Immelt to succeed the retiring Jack Welch as chairman and CEO of General Electric. When Immelt won the three-way race, McNerney and Nardelli left GE (as was Welch's plan); McNerney was hired by 3M in 2001.

From 2001 to 2005, McNerney held the position as chairman of the board and CEO of 3M, a global industrial company with leading positions in electronics, telecommunications, industrial, consumer and office products, health care, safety and other businesses.

Boeing
On June 30, 2005, The Boeing Company hired McNerney as the chairman, President, and CEO. McNerney oversaw the strategic direction of the Chicago-based aerospace company with a focus on spending controls.

As Boeing's first CEO without a background in aviation, he made the decision to upgrade the 737 series to 737 MAX instead of developing a new model.

Compensation 
In 2007, as CEO of Boeing, W. James McNerney Jr. made $12,904,478 in total compensation, which included a base salary of $1,800,077, a cash bonus of $4,266,500, options granted of $5,871,650, and Other $966,251. 
 
In 2008, his total compensation increased to $14,765,410, which included a base salary of $1,915,288, a cash bonus of $6,089,625, and options granted of $5,914,440.

In 2009, his total compensation decreased to $13,705,435, which included a base salary of $1,930,000, a cash bonus of $4,500,300, stock options granted of $3,136,251, stock granted of $3,136,242, and other compensation totaling $1,002,642.

In 2013, McNerney made $23.2 million in total compensation, which included a $1.9 million salary, $3.7 million stock award, $3.7 million stock option grant, and an annual incentive bonus of $12.8 million.

In 2014, as Chairman and CEO of Boeing, McNerney made $29 million in total compensation. Of the total: $2,004,231 was received as a salary; $14,400,000 was received as an annual bonus and a three-year performance bonus; $6,272,517 was awarded as stock (none was received in stock options); and other compensation totaling $760,000.

Positions 

McNerney has been a member of the Boeing board of directors since 2001. He is also a member of the board of directors of Procter & Gamble and IBM. He served as Chairman of The Business Council in 2007 and 2008. He is a current member of the Northwestern University Board of Trustees, is a Trustee at the Center for Strategic and International Studies and served as Chairman of the President's Export Council, appointed by President Barack Obama.

In December 2016, McNerney joined a business forum assembled by then president-elect Donald Trump to provide strategic and policy advice on economic issues.

Career path

References

Further reading

External links 
 W. James McNerney, Jr. executive biography
 

American chairpersons of corporations
American chief executives of manufacturing companies
Boeing people
American corporate directors
1949 births
Living people
American management consultants
Chairmen of Boeing
General Electric people
Procter & Gamble people
Businesspeople from Providence, Rhode Island
People from Winnetka, Illinois
Harvard Business School alumni
McKinsey & Company people
New Trier High School alumni
Yale University alumni